Homoleptic azido compounds are chemical compounds in which the only anion or ligand is the azide group, -N3. The breadth of homoleptic azide compounds spans nearly the entire periodic table. With rare exceptions azido compounds are highly shock sensitive and need to be handled with the upmost caution. Binary azide compounds can take on several different structures including discrete compounds, or one- two, and three-dimensional nets, leading some to dub them as "polyazides".  Reactivity studies of azide compounds are relatively limited due to how sensitive they can be. The sensitivity of these compounds tends to be correlated with the amount of ionic or covalent character the azide-element bond has, with ionic character being far more stable than covalent character. Therefore, compounds such as silver or sodium azide –  which have strong ionic character – tend to posses more synthetic utility than their covalent counterparts. A few other notable exceptions include polymeric networks which possess unique magnetic properties, group 13 azides which unlike most other azides decompose to nitride compounds (important materials for semiconductors), other limited uses as synthetic reagents for the transfer for azide groups, or interest in high energy density materials.

Synthesis 

There are several general routes and strategies employed when synthesizing homoleptic azido compounds. Salt metathesis between an azide salt like sodium azide or silver azide and the metal chloride is how a lot of the earlier azides were prepared. Another popular route include acid-base reactions hydrazoic acid HN3 and either hydrido or lewis base complexes. However, modern methods often rely on halide-azide exchange with trimethylsilyl azide SiMe3N3 with the metal fluorides as incomplete halide/azide exchange is often seen when using the chloride derivatives.

Neutral binary azides are rather difficult to study due to the fluxional nature of the azido ligands and their lack of thermal and shock stability. Their lack of stability is in part due to the covalent binding of the azido ligand to the metal center which favors a single and a triple bond in the azide moiety. Increasing the ionic character of the azido group – either by the introduction of anion formation or N-donor adducts – favors two double bonds instead. This ionic bonding motif therefore increases the activation barrier for breaking of the N-N bond to release N2 and helps to stabilize the compounds. The resulting compounds can still be highly shock sensitive and need to be handled with caution.

Transition metals

Group 4 
Group 4 polyazides of the formula M(N3)4 are predicted to have linear or near linear M-N-N angles unlike their main group counterparts which are predicted to have bent M-N-N angles. This couldn’t be proved in the case of Ti(N3)4, owing to difficulty in crystallization. However, incorporation of large spacer counterions or N-donor adducts makes the compounds far easier to work with. In the cases of [PPh4]2[M(N3)6] (M=Ti, Zr, Hf), only the axial ligands exhibit near linear M-N-N angles whereas the equatorial ligands are closer to bent angles. This deviation in theory is also seen in the N-donor adducts.

The main hypothesis given for why these compounds do not have linear M-N-N angles despite theoretical calculations is that these adducts are not tetrahedral. In the homoleptic tetrahedral compounds, the nitrogen closest to the (+IV) metal center is positioned in such a way that the three valence electron pairs can donate to the vacant d orbitals on the metal and therefore the azido can act as a tridentate donor ligand in which case the expected coordination would be linear. Since the adduct compounds are not tetrahedral, the azido group can only act as a monodentate donor with two sterically active electron pairs which result in a bent M-N-N bond angles.

Group 5 
The neutral binary V(IV) azide as well as V(III), V(IV), and V(V) azido ions are known. Similar to the neutral Ti(IV) azide, V(N3)4 is difficult to study due to high shock and temperature instability. However, [V(N3)6]2- paired with a large, inert counterion is relatively stable and crystalizeses as a near perfect octahedral. In contrast to V(IV), the neutral binary V(V) could not be synthesized and attempts result in the reduction of V(V) to V(IV) with the elimination of N2 gas. Fortunately, the oxidation potentials of anions are lower than that of their parent compounds so [V(N3)6]- can be formed. Unlike [V(N3)6]2-, [V(N3)6]- is highly shock sensitive and distorted from octahedral symmetry with three long and three short M-N bonds in mer positions.

The neutral binary Nb(N3)5 and Ta(N3)5 also exist, and the acetonitrile adducts of these compounds contain a nearly linear azido trans to the coordinating acetonitrile. They represent the first evidence of linear M-N-N bonding. The corresponding anions [Nb(N3)6]-, [Nb(N3)7]2-, [Ta(N3)6]-, and [Ta(N3)7]2- are known and accordingly are much less shock sensitive. The structure of the hexaazido monoanions are similar to other heptaazido monoanions with bent azido ligands despite being predicted to have perfect S6 symmetry in the gas phase for [Nb(N3)6]. The heptaazido dianions possess monocapped triangular-prismatic 1/4/2 structures unlike the actinide trianion [U(N3)7]3- which crystallizes as a monocapped octahedron or pentagonal bipyramid. Several N-donor adducts are known to exist as well. Reactions of the neutral binary NbF5 and TaF5 in the presence of Me3SiN3 with N-donors containing small bite angles such as 2,2’-bipyridine or 1,10-phenanthroline result in self ionization products of the type [M(N3)4L2]+[M(N3)6]- (L= N-donor) whereas N-donors containing large bite angles such as 3,3’-bipryidine or 4,4’-bipyridine produces the neutral pentaazide adducts M(N3)5•L (L=N-donor).

Group 6 
Both Mo(N3)6 and W(N3)6 have been synthesized, and W(N3)6 is stable enough to grow single crystals. Contrary to group 4 and group 5 binary azido compounds, the anionic [Mo(N3)7]- and [W(N3)7]- are less stable and more sensitive to handle than their neutral parent compounds.  Upon warming solutions of the heptaazido anions in either MeCN or SO2 to room temperature, the tetraazido nitrido ions [NMo(N3)4]- and [NW(N3)4]- are formed with elimination of N2.

Group 7 

Group 7 azide compounds are dominated by manganese chemistry. The first Mn polyazide compound was reported by Wöhler et al. in 1917 by reaction of MnCO3 with HN3 to form Mn(N3)2. Many divalent Mn salts have been synthesized and represent true polymeric systems. The azido moiety can bind as end-on (EO) (µ-1,1) or end-to-end (EE) (µ-1,3) to usually give ferromagnetic or antiferromagnetic coupling respectively. 1D chains are formed when 2,2’-bipyridine, a bidentate ligand, is used as the counter ion in the reaction between Mn(ClO4)2 • 6H2O and excess NaN3. This results in a chain with alternating EE and EO bridges which predictably gives alternating antiferromagnetic-ferromagnetic coupling. However, unfortunately except at absolute 0K one-dimensional systems show no magnetic ordering. Therefore, polymers of increasing dimensionality are of interest. A 2D system is formed upon reaction of MnCl2• 4H2O and NaN3 in the presence of 4,4’-dipyridino-N,N’diacetic acid which undergoes in situ  decarboxylation to afford alternating layers of [Mn(N3)4]2- with EE bridging azides and the 4,4’-dipyridine dication. The metal centers in this compound do show antiferromagnetic coupling but this is strictly not due to spin canting because of the uncommon centrosymmetry of the bridging azido ligands. Another 2D structure is accessed via the reaction of (PPh4)2MnCl2 with AgN3 to form the nonexplosive [PPh4]2[Mn(N3)4] which has alternating ion layers.  

The first example of a 3D azido compound was synthesized in the reaction of Mn(NO3)2 • 4H2O in hot aqueous [N(CH3)4][N3] saturated with HN3 to form [N(CH3)4][Mn(N3)3]. This compound has a pseudo-perovskite structure with [N(CH3)4]+ ions in the cavities between the Mn centers. The azido moieties are arranged in an EE fashion, and indeed, this compound exhibits the expected antiferromagnetic behavior. The cesium analogue Cs[Mn(N3)3] is synthesized in the same manner but uses CsN3 instead of [N(CH3)4][N3] and is structurally unique from the tetramethylammonium version. For each 6 coordinate Mn, 4 of the azido linkages are EE and two are EO instead of all six being EE. This arrangement results in a honeycomb-like shape and a rare example of alternating ferro-antiferromagnetic interactions in 3D solid. 

Examples of manganese azido compounds in higher oxidation states are relatively rare. The triazide acetonitrile adduct can be prepared using the fluoride exchange route to give Mn(N3)3CN as a dark red shock sensitive compound. Upon addition of PPh4N3 the compound disproportionates into an insensitive mixture of [PPh4]2[Mn(N3)2] and [PPh4]2[Mn(N3)6]. The Mn(IV) salt can be prepared on its own by using Cs2MnF6 as the starting material to give the highly explosive Cs2[Mn(N3)6].

Group 8 

The first penta-coordinate azide and the ninth trigonal bipyramidal compound reported was the pentaazidoiron (III) ion [Fe(N3)5]2- and this compound can be made through either halid or nitrate elimination from an iron (III) starting material. For applications however, iron azides tend to not be isolated but are instead generated in situ in the preparation of azidoalkanes. NaN3 and iron (III) sulfate Fe2(SO4)3 are combined in methanol and added to an organoborane followed by slow addition of 30% hydrogen peroxide, presumably forming Fe(N3)3. When combined with alkenes, the azide will insert in an anti-markovnikov fashion. The role of the peroxide is not well understood but it is crucial for this reaction to occur. 

A ruthenium tetrabutylammonium salt can be prepared by reacting K2[RuIVCl6] with NaN3 in ethanol and water. N2 gas is liberated and the reduced ruthenium (III) species [n-Bu4N]3[Ru(N3)6] is afforded. This compound has largely been studied in terms of its optical properties.

Group 9 
Tetraazido cobalt(II) compounds have been isolated as both the tetraphenylphosphonium and tetraphenylarsonium salts from solutions of cobalt sulfate with a 15 time sexcess of NaN3 to yield [Ph4P]2[Co(N3)4] and [Ph4As]2[Co(N3)4] respectively. The autooxidation of solutions of  [Co(N3)4]2- can be used as a colorimetric spot test for the presence of sulfite ions.

Tetrabutylammonium salts of rhodium(III) and iridium(III) azides are known and are prepared by reacting a large excess of NaN3 in an aqueous solution with the corresponding Na3[MCl6] • 12H2O metal chloride salt to form [n-Bu4N]3[Rh(N3)6] and [n-Bu4N]3[Ir(N3)6].

Group 10 

Nickel azide can be prepared by distilling HN3 onto nickel carbonate and precipitated with acetone to afford Ni(N3)2. Sample of Ni(N3)2 will begin to rapidly decompose upon heating to 490K by roughly 35% followed by slow decomposition of the remaining material. It is thought that the first phase of decomposition results in microcrystals with metallic nickel on the outside and Ni(N3)2 at the core. The reaction slows because now decomposition must occur at the Ni/Ni(N3)2 interface. 

[Pd(N3)4]2- anions are square planar and the degree of interaction between the anion and its corresponding cation can be determined by the amount of deviation in the torsion angles from the ideal geometry. Various platinates [Pt(N3)4]2- and [Pt(N3)6]4- are known and are prepared from Pt chloride salts with NaN3. Pt(II) salts tend to be far less stable than the Pt(IV) versions, and they either decompose fairly rapidly upon standing or explode. Their sensitivity in part has been explained by poor crystal packing.

Group 11 
The copper(I) binary azide CuN3 is a 1D ionic compound with chains that run diagonally to the unit cell. Many Copper (II) azides ions are known spanning the series of  [Cu(N3)3]-, [Cu(N3)4]2-, and [Cu(N3)6]2-. Three coordinate copper azide complexes form linear 1D chains with two EE and one EO azido ligands in contrast with the Mn analogue that forms a 3D structure. The dinuclear species and [Cu(N3)4]2- are both monomeric in nature. All copper azides are explosive but their sensitivities vary widely from the parent azides CuN3 and Cu(N3)2 which are extremely sensitive to the ions paired with large countercations that are practically insensitive.

Silver (I) azide is a well known explosive compound and has been demonstrated to form a 2D coordination polymer with square planar Ag+ ions surrounded by azido ligands in an EE fashion. Slow ramping of temperature from 150°C to 251°C results in melting and slow decomposition but rapid heating to 300°C results in an explosion.

Gold(III) azide is known as the tetraethylammonium salt [Et4N][Au(N3)4] and also adopts a square planar structure. However unlike the silver azide, the gold azide is not stable at room temperature and will decompose after a few days and its metal azide bonds have significant covalent character.

Group 12 
While Zn(N3)2 has been known since the late 1890s, solvent free Zn(N3)2 was isolated for the first time in 2016 from a dry ethereal solution of HN3 and Et2Zn in n-hexane. Zn(N3)2 crystallizes in three different polymorphs α-Zn(N3)2 and the labile β-Zn(N3)2 and γ-Zn(N3)2 forms. 

The first mercury (I) azide was realized by Curtius in 1890 by combining aqueous mercury(I) salts with alkali metal azides or by combining HN3 with elemental mercury to produce Hg2(N3)2, and as evidenced by the electron localization function, the compound is stabilized by ionic bonds between the azido ligands N3- and Hg+ and covalent bonding between +Hg-Hg+. Both mercury (I) and mercury(II) azides can be easily prepared by mixing the respective mercury nitrates with sodium azide in aqueous solution at roomtemperature. The mercury (II) azide Hg(N3)2 exists in two polymorphs α-Hg(N3)2 and β-Hg(N3)2. The β form is very labile and quickly turns into the α polymorphs at room temperature. However, the β polymorph can prepared in analogy to β-Pb(N3)2 by slow diffusion of aqueous NaN3 into a solution of Hg(NO3)2 separated by a layer of aqueous NaNO3, but crystals nearly always explode during formation leading to a mixture of α and β polymorphs.

Binary cadmium azide Cd(N3)2 can be prepared from CdCO3 and aqueous HN3. However, it is structural unrelated to the mercury or zinc anaolgues and is based on repeat units of Cd2(N3)10 double octahedrals.

Main group compounds

Group 13 
Boron triazide was first prepared by the addition of diborane to an ethereal solution of NH3 to make B(N3)3. The compound is relatively volatile and can undergo explosive decomposition at temperatures above -35°C.  In contrast, aluminum azide Al(N3)3 is relatively stable and will only deflagrate in a match test. However, it decomposes hydrolytically within minutes when exposed to atmospheric moisture. Al(N3)3 has some synthetic applications and when generated in situ can react with β-unsaturated cyano esters to form tetrazoles in bulk scale. Gas phase reactions of AlMe3 and HN3 have been reported to form Al(N3)3. However, at room temperature this compound decomposes to AlN2 and AlN leading to the suggestion that Al(N3)3 can be used to prepare AlN.

Owing to the interest in GaN as a semiconductor, group 13 azido chemistry is dominated by the gallium azides. Na[Ga(N3)4] is polymeric 3D network with EO bridging azides. This compound serves as a valuable precursor to the synthesis of donor stabilized monomeric gallium triazides Ga(N3)3Lm which upon heating decompose to the polymeric [Ga(N3)3]∞ and produces GaN after detonation. Ga(N3)3 can readily be analyzed as its tetraphosphonium salt [PPh4]2[Ga(N3)5]. The increased ionicity of the azido ligands and the presence of the two large counterions which diminish shock propagation make the compound significantly less sensitive.

The indium azide In(N3)3 can also be prepared via the fluoride exchange route and is similarly stabilized as the tetraphosphonium salt [PPh4]3[In(N3)6].

Thallium (I) azide TlN3 will explode when mechanically or thermally shocked, but it has a lower impact sensitivity than the related mercury or lead azides. Interestingly TlN3 is one of the few azides that melts before it explodes. Its friction sensitivity is highest in thin layers, so it should still be handled with care. The thallium (III) azide Tl(N3)3 was recently synthesized via fluoride-azide exchange, but the resulting compound is very sensitive and crystals can only be analyzed as the tetraphosphonium salt [PPh4]3[Tl(N3)6].

Group 14 
Diazido- and triazidomethane can be prepared via simple nucleophilic substitution of methylene chloride or bromoform respectively with the azide ion on quaternary ammonia resin. Solutions greater than 70% purity of diazidomethane should be avoided as they have a tendency to explode with any minor mechanical disturbance such as pipetting. Tetraazidomethane C(N3)4 cannot be prepared from carbontetrahalides and instead can be obtained via a reaction of trichloroacetonitrile Cl3CN with NaN3 albeit in relatively low yields. Yields can be significantly improved by reacting triazidomethylium hexachloroantimonate [C(N3)3][SbCl6]with sodium or lithium azide LiN3; the starting material is explosive in this route. In general, pure tetraazidomethane should be avoided, and even solutions should not be handled manually. The compound can explode at any time without apparent provocation and a singular drop is capable of shattering glass and vacuum Dewars. 

Unlike the carbon analogue, the silicon tetraazide Si(N3)4 can be prepared from SiCl4 and NaN3. However this reaction will also precipitate various amounts of silicon chloroazides which can be avoided by prolonging reaction times. Additionally, unlike the boron and aluminum azides, Si(N3)4 cannot be obtained via the reaction between SiH4 and HN3. The hexaazidosicalte salt [(Ph3P)2N]2[Si(N3)6] exists and has a very rare octahedral SiN6 framework.

The germanium tetraazide Ge(N3)4 has not been confirmed to exist in a pure form and is assumed to be partially halogenated when attempts to synthesize it have been made. However, unlike its transition metal counterparts (see group 4), it is predicted to have bent Ge-N angles as opposed to linear ones. By switching solvents from nonpolar to polar, the NaN3 employed in the reaction becomes much more soluble and leads to the hexaazido germanate Na2[Ge(N3)6]. The presence of a weakly coordinating counterion such as tetraphenylarsine enables the formation of low valent germanates from the trichloride anion to form the germanium (II) [Ge(N3)3]- that will not convert to the germanium (IV) upon further exposure to NaN3, but the low valent salts are very prone to oxidation.

The parent Sn(IV) compound has not been reported and neutral Sn(N3)4 has only been reported with ancillary ligands. Reactions with SnCl4 and NaN3 instead lead to the hexaazido Na2Sn(N3)6, a far more stable compound that its analogues in group 14. The salt is only slightly water sensitive and deflagrates in a flame test. Low valent stannates of the type [Sn(N3)3]- have been synthesized and just like the analogous germanates are very sensitive compounds. They do not appear to have a sterically active lone pair and tend to dimerize with EE interactions.

Lead azide is one of the most prevalent homoleptic azides owing to its ubiquitous use as a primary explosive. Uniquely it is the only group 14 azide that is more prevalent in its divalent Pb2+ form. The α, β, γ, and ∂ polymorphs exist but the α form is the only one that finds extensive technical applications. Homoleptic azides of Pb(IV) exist but like the tin versions Pb(N3)4 is not a stable compound, and attempts to synthesis it from PbO2 and HN3 for red needles that quickly explode and decompose to Pb(N3)2. The compound can however be isolated as the [Pb(N3)6]2- ions with large organic cations to yield a nonexplosive compound.

Group 15 
In the general sense, azides of group 15 elements tend to resemble their chlorides but with higher volatility and less thermostability.  Nitrogen rich compounds such as N(N3)3 have been postulated as synthetically possible but have not yet been made. 

The phosphorus triazide P(N3)3 can be synthesized by reaction of NaN3 and PCl3, but there has not been a successful synthesis of an ionic phosphorus (III) azido compound. Despite the existence of PCl5, the pseudohalide analogue P(N3)5 has been reported but not yet been confirmed. The phosphorus (V) azides are restricted to their ionic salts and can be made as either the antimonate salt [P(N3)4]+[SbCl6]- from PCl3 or the sodium salt Na[P(N3)6] from PCl5.

As(N3)3 can be prepared from the fluoride exchange route, and the resulting crystal structure has EO bridging of two of the azido groups, giving a coordination number of 7 and an infinite zig-zag chain structure. However, the solution state 14N NMR of  As(N3)3 confirms that this compounds are in fact monomeric in solution, and the lone pair of arsenic is calculated to be sterically active as evidenced by the optimized gas phase geometry and contour plot of the total electron density. Unlike phosphorus, the parent arsenic(V) azide has been isolated as As(N3)5 and exists as a yellow liquid. The entire series of arsenic azido ions have been reported, [As(N3)4]-, [As(N3)4]+, and [As(N3)6]-. The cationic species have the shortest As-N and Nβ-Nγ distance whereas the anionic ones tend to have much longer As-N distances and therefore partially explains why the cationic compounds tend to be much more explosive.

The antimony(III) azide Sb(N3)3 is prepared in a similar manner to the arsenic one and has a similar structure with the exception that all three of azido ligands are participating in EO bridging and produce a highly symmetrical sheet. Sb(N5)5 exists as a highly unstable compound and cannot be handled at ambient temperatures without explosion. The series of antimony azide salts [Sb(N3)4]-, [Sb(N3)4]+, and [Sb(N3)6]- are known and have similar trends to the arsenic ones.

Binary bismuth azides remained elusive until 2010 when clean Bi(N3)3 was isolated using the fluoride exchange route. The series of bismuth (III) ions [Bi(N3)4]-, [Bi(N3)5]2-, and [Bi(N3)6]3- have been synthesized and structurally characterized. The bismuth lone pair is sterically active in all of the ions. In the solid state, bismuth structures tend to differ widely from their lighter group 15 counterparts since bismuth can accommodate larger coordination numbers, and the structures are based on Bi2N2 parallelogram with a coordination number of 8. Attempts at making Bi(V) compounds result in reduction to Bi(III) by N3-.

Group 16 
The oxygen diazide O(N3)2 has been suggested to be the intermediate in the formation of cyclic nitrous oxide N2O from OF2 and NaN3, but its existence has not yet been confirmed. The parent sulfur azides S(N3)2 or S(N3)4 have not been synthesized and only theoretical calculations to their existence have been studied. Although, the sulfuryl azide SO2(N3)2 is known and has been fully characterized.

The series of binary selenium azides Se(N3)4, [Se(N3)5]-, and [Se(N3)6]2- have been prepared via the fluoride exchange route. The neutral Se(N3)4 is relatively unstable and can detonate even at -64°C under SO2 without provocation. Therefore, solid state characterization is restricted to the ions, and show that the azido groups have strong covalent character. The [Se(N3)6]2- ion crystalizes with perfect S6 symmetry, and thus, the lone pair is not thought to be sterically active.

The tellerium (IV) azides [Te(N3)3]+, Te(N3)4, [Te(N3)5]-, and [Te(N3)6]2- are typically prepared by reduction of the tellurium (VI) fluoride TeF6 via the fluoride exchange route. Unsurprisingly, the Te(N3)4 is a very sensitive compound, and the salts are much less shock sensitive. Unlike the above selenium salt, the lone pair in the tellurium dianion [Te(N3)6]2- is sterically active and therefore forces a distorted pseudo pentagonal bipyramidal structure.

Group 17 
The four azide halides FN3, ClN3, BrN3, and IN3 have all been made, and all contain purely covalent azide-halide bonds making them extremely sensitive. The gas phase reaction between F2 and HN3 will produce FN3 but the F2 needs to be diluted in an inert gas, and fast mixing needs to be avoided to F2N2 isn’t formed. Chlorine azide is also a gas and can be produced by bubbling dilute chlorine gas through a solution of NaN3. However, chlorine azide tends to explode spontaneously even at reduced temperatures. Bromine azide is a liquid but is still equally treacherous. The NaN3 used must be dry as BrN3 hydrolyzes in water. Similarly, the iodine azide is moisture sensitive and can be made from ICl and AgN3 as a solid. However, since AgN3 can only be handled safely when moist, drying agent is normally added to the reaction mixture to prevent hydrolysis of the final product. Both BrN3 and IN3 find use in synthesis a convenient way to make azidiridines and azirines. The chlorine, bromine, and iodine azides have been characterized in the solid state. The chlorine azide has strong Cl-Cl interactions and is comparable to the herringbone arrangement of other halogen structures. In contrast, the bromine and iodine azides prefer intermolecular X-N interactions to give a helical structure for the BrN3 and flat chains for IN3.

References 

Chemical compounds